Nogometni klub Kočevje, commonly referred to as NK Kočevje or simply Kočevje, is a Slovenian football club from Kočevje which plays in the Ljubljana Regional League, the fourth level of the Slovenian football system. The club was founded in 1920.

The team have won the Slovenian Second League in the 1993–94 season and competed in the top division, Slovenian PrvaLiga, during the 1994–95 season, before going bankrupt at the end of the season.

Honours
Slovenian Second League
 Winners: 1993–94

Ljubljana Regional League (fourth tier)
 Winners: 2018–19

References

External links
Official website 

Association football clubs established in 1920
Football clubs in Slovenia
1920 establishments in Slovenia